X Factor is a Danish television music competition to find new singing talent. The Third season premiered on 1 January 2010 and ended on 27 March on DR1. Signe Muusmann replaced Lise Rønne as host. Remee returned for his third season as judge and Pernille Rosendahl and Soushock replaced Thomas Blachman and Lina Rafn as judges.

Judges and hosts

Selection process

Auditions
Auditions took place in Copenhagen and Århus in 2009.

Superbootcamp
Remee was given the 15-24s category, Rosendahl was given the Over 25s and Soulshock was given the Groups.

Bootcamp

The 6 eliminated acts were:
15-24s: Rasmus, Tine
Over 25s: Eline, Joan
Groups: Frigg, Freja & Katie, Sistersoul

Finalists

Key:
 – Winner
 – Runner-up

Live shows

Colour key:
{|
|-
| –  Contestant was in the bottom two and had to sing again in the final showdown
|-
| – Contestant received the fewest public votes and was immediately eliminated (no final showdown)
|-
| – Contestant was saved by the public
|-
|}

Contestants' colour key:
{|
|-
| – Remee's contestants (15-24s)
|-
| – Rosendahl's contestants (Over 25s)
|-
| – Soulshock's contestants (Groups)
|}

Live show details
Colour key:
{|
|-
| –  Contestant was in the bottom two and had to sing again in the final showdown
|-
| – Contestant was eliminated
|-
| – Contestant was saved by the public
|-
|}

Week 1 (12 February)
Theme: Free Choice

Judges' votes to eliminate
 Soulshock: Peter Søberg
 Rosendahl: In-Joy
 Remee: Peter Søberg

Week 2 (19 February)
Theme: Michael Jackson songs

Judges' votes to eliminate
 Soulshock: Daniel Vensgaard
 Rosendahl: In-Joy
 Remee: In-Joy

Week 3 (26 February)
Theme: Rock
Musical Guest: The Storm ("Honesty")

Judges' votes to eliminate
 Rosendahl: 8210
 Remee: The Fireflies
 Soulshock: 8210

Week 4 (5 March)
Theme: UK Number Ones
Musical Guest: Cheryl Cole ("Fight for This Love")

Judges' votes to eliminate
 Remee: Daniel Vensgaard
 Rosendahl: Tine Midtgaard
 Soulshock: Daniel Vensgaard

Week 5 (12 March)
Theme: James Bond songs

Judges' votes to eliminate
 Soulshock: Jesper Boesgaard
 Rosendahl: Anna Nygaard
 Remee: Anna Nygaard

Week 6 Semi-Final (19 March)
Theme: Gasolin and Viewers Choice

The semi-final did not feature a final showdown and instead the act with the fewest public votes, The Fireflies, was automatically eliminated.

Week 7: Final (27 March) 
 Theme: Free Choice; Duet with Musical Guests; winner's single

References

Season 03
2010 Danish television seasons